Giacomo Locatelli (or Lucatelli) (Verona, 1580–1628) was an Italian painter. Other authors call him Girolamo Locatelli.

Biography
While born at Verona, he studied in Bologna under Guido Reni and Francesco Albani. Among his works are two pictures in the church of San Fermo Maggiore at Verona, for the church of Santa Maria in Organo, and for the Chapel of the Madonna in San Procolo.

References

1580 births
1628 deaths
16th-century Italian painters
Italian male painters
17th-century Italian painters
Painters from Bologna
Painters from Verona
Italian Baroque painters